Theodoor Gautier Thomas Pigeaud (20 February 1899 in Leipzig – 6 March 1988 in Gouda) was an expert in Javanese literature from the Netherlands. He especially became famous for his Java-Netherlands dictionary (1938) that Poerwadarminto chose as foundation of Baoesastra Djawa. Moreover, Pigeaud was also known because of his monumental study about Nagarakretagama and text catalogues of the manuscripts in the libraries of Netherlands, Denmark, and Germany.

Personal life

Early years 
Theodoor Gautier Thomas Pigeaud was born on February 20, 1899, in Leipzig, Germany. He was the youngest of three children of Dr. Jan Jacob Pigeaud (1862–1942), a doctor, and his wife, Adolfina Adriana Frederika Bodde (1866–1947).

References

References 

1899 births
1988 deaths
Dutch academics
Dutch lexicographers
Javanists
Writers from The Hague
Leiden University alumni
20th-century lexicographers